Martin S. Brill (May 6, 1932 – January 23, 2021) was an American comedian, writer, actor and musician who appeared regularly on 1960s and 1970s TV in both variety shows (The Ed Sullivan Show, The Merv Griffin Show, The Tonight Show) and sitcoms (The New Dick Van Dyke Show, The Mary Tyler Moore Show). In the late 1970s, Marty Brill did some writing in the 1970s for the "New Soupy Sales Show," also occasionally playing characters on the show, especially after Soupy's longtime sidekick (Clyde Adler) took ill during production of the series. 
He also was the lyricist for the short lived 1964 Broadway musical Cafe Crown.

He also voiced King Koo Koo in the 1977 film Raggedy Ann & Andy: A Musical Adventure and sang one of the film's songs. Brill was born in Chicago, Illinois, on May 6, 1932, and died on January 23, 2021, at the age of 88.

Discography
The Roving Balladeer
"Timber"
James Blonde ("The Man From T.A.N.T.E.")
He was involved with a comedy album called "The Other Family". This was a take-off on "The First Family" but about the Khrushchevs in the Kremlin.

He dubbed The Six Shooter into Japanese - mentioned on SiriusXM Radio Classics.

Filmography

References

External links

1932 births
2021 deaths
21st-century American comedians
American male comedians
American male voice actors
American musical theatre lyricists